Turkmenistan participated in the 2010 Summer Youth Olympics in Singapore.

Medalists

Boxing

Boys

Judo

Individual

Team

Swimming

Weightlifting

References

2010 in Turkmenistani sport
Nations at the 2010 Summer Youth Olympics
Turkmenistan at the Youth Olympics